The TMA-3 is a circular Yugoslavian minimum metal anti-tank blast mine. It is very similar in appearance to the TMA-4. The mine consists of a cast circular block of explosive cased in resin reinforced fabric. The top of the mine has three fuze wells which each take a UTMA-3 fuze, and a fourth secondary fuze well is provided in the base of the mine to fit an anti-handling device. The fuze wells may also accept a number of other fuzes, including the UPROM-1, and other fuzes, potentially allowing tripwire activation. The small pressure plate area of the UTMA-3 fuzes gives the mine good resistance to minefield clearance techniques which used blast overpressure techniques i.e. explosive charges.

The mine is found in Albania, Angola, Bosnia, Croatia, Kosovo, Lebanon, and Namibia.

Specifications
 Diameter: 265 mm
 Height (with fuze): 110 mm
 Weight: 7 kg
 Explosive content: 6.5 kg of TNT
 Operating pressure: 180 kg

References
 Jane's Mines and Mine Clearance 2005-2006
 

Anti-tank mines
Land mines of Yugoslavia